William Wain is a former Australian international lawn bowler.

Bowls career
Wain was selected as part of the five man team by Australia for the 1988 World Outdoor Bowls Championship, which was held in Auckland, New Zealand.

He won a pairs gold medal (with Dennis Katunarich) and a fours bronze medal, at the 1987 Asia Pacific Bowls Championships, held in Lae, Papua New Guinea.

References

Australian male bowls players
Living people
Year of birth missing (living people)